F Minus is a horizontally oriented single panel comic strip by Tony Carrillo, started when he was a sophomore at Arizona State University. It ran daily in The State Press, an independent newspaper at ASU, from 2002 until 2004, when Carrillo graduated.

In an online mtvU strips contest with Scott Adams of Dilbert fame as member of the jury and with almost 200,000 people voting to find the best college comic strip, F Minus came in first place.

Having won a development deal with United Features Syndicate through the contest, syndication of F Minus (in daily newspapers) began on April 17, 2006 in 75 newspapers throughout the United States.

According to Tony Carrillo, most of the comics are about stupidity and losers. It does not feature any story lines and is often compared to one of his favorites, The Far Side by Gary Larson.

In 2007, F Minus was nominated in the 2007 Reuben Awards for Best Newspaper Panel but lost to Rhymes with Orange by Hilary B. Price.

The Phoenix New Times named F Minus as the best syndicated comic strip in its Best of Phoenix 2007 issue.

Books
There are two collections of F Minus.

Notes

External links
 Author's web site
 F Minus on gocomics.com
 United Features Syndicate page on F Minus
 Dark Party Review Interview with Tony Carrillo

American comic strips
Gag cartoon comics
2002 comics debuts
2004 comics endings